The Waterford U16 Hurling Championship is an underage hurling played by juvenile Gaelic Athletic Association (GAA) in Waterford in Ireland. All players have to be under the age of 16 in the year in which they take part. The competition is organized by the two divisions of the Waterford Bord na Óige - East Division and West Division. The current A division champions are Ballygunner GAA.

Roll of honour

6